Ophioglossum, the adder's-tongue ferns, is a genus of about 50 species of ferns in the family Ophioglossaceae. The name Ophioglossum comes from the Greek meaning "snake-tongue". Their cosmopolitan distribution is mainly in tropical and subtropical habitats.

The genus has the largest number of chromosomes in the known plant kingdom, but contrary to popular belief does not have the largest number of chromosomes out of all known organisms, falling short to the protist Sterkiella histriomuscorum.

Description
Adders-tongues are so-called because the spore-bearing stalk is thought to resemble a snake's tongue. Each plant typically sends up a small, undivided leaf blade with netted venation, and the spore stalk forks from the leaf stalk, terminating in sporangia which are partially concealed within a structure with slit sides.

When the leaf blade is present, there is not always a spore stalk present, and the plants do not always send up a leaf, sometimes going for a year to a period of years living only under the soil, nourished by association with soil fungi.

The plant grows from a central, budding, fleshy structure with fleshy, radiating roots.

Taxonomy
Ophioglossum has a high chromosome count in comparison to other species, with 120 or up to 720 chromosomes possible in intervals of 120 due to polyploidy (multiple possible copies of chromosomes). It has almost 1260 number of chromosomes in the meiocyte (spore mother cell) which undergo meiosis, the reduction division to form the spore with only one set of chromosomes getting incorporated into each spore.

Species

, World Ferns listed the following species:

Goswamia 
Ophioglossum costatum  
Ophioglossum eliminatum  – status uncertain
Ophioglossum gomezianum  
Ophioglossum gujaratensis 
Ophioglossum hitkishorei 
Ophioglossum indicum 
Ophioglossum isanensis 
Ophioglossum malviae 
Ophioglossum nudicaule  
Ophioglossum raphaelianum  
Ophioglossum rubellum  
Ophioglossum trilokinathii  
Haukia
Ophioglossum crotalophoroides  
Ophioglossum opacum  
Ophioglossum tuberosum  
Whittieria 
Ophioglossum engelmannii 
Ophioglossum s.s.
Ophioglossum ammophilum  – sometimes included in O. gomezianum
Ophioglossum austroasiaticum  – possibly a synonym of O. reticulatum
Ophioglossum azoricum  
Ophioglossum californicum  
Ophioglossum caroticaule  
Ophioglossum convexum  
Ophioglossum coriaceum  
Ophioglossum fernandezianum  – doubtful species
Ophioglossum × giovanninii  
Ophioglossum gracile  – may be included in O. gramineum
Ophioglossum gracillimum  
Ophioglossum gramineum  
Ophioglossum harrisii  
Ophioglossum jaykrishnae  – provisionally accepted name
Ophioglossum kawamurae  
Ophioglossum lancifolium  
Ophioglossum latifolium  
Ophioglossum lineare  – possibly a synonym of O. parvifolium
Ophioglossum louisii  
Ophioglossum lusitanicum  
Ophioglossum lusoafricanum  
Ophioglossum melipillense  
Ophioglossum namegatae  – probably a synonym of O. petiolatum
Ophioglossum oblongum  
Ophioglossum parvifolium  
Ophioglossum parvum  
Ophioglossum petiolatum 
Ophioglossum × pierinii  
Ophioglossum polyphyllum  
Ophioglossum × pseudoazoricum  
Ophioglossum pusillum  
Ophioglossum reticulatum  
Ophioglossum sandieae  
Ophioglossum scariosum  
Ophioglossum thermale  
Ophioglossum thomasii  
Ophioglossum vulgatum  
Ophioglossum yongrenense 

Species that may be placed in this genus include:
Ophioglossum bergianum 	= Rhizoglossum bergianum
Ophioglossum falcatum  = Ophioderma falcatum
Ophioglossum intermedium  = Ophioderma intermedium
Ophioglossum simplex  = Ophioderma simplex

References

External links
 Flora of North America: Ophioglossum (Adder's-tongue)

 
Ophioglossaceae
Fern genera
Taxa named by Carl Linnaeus